Julius Berend Cohen FRS (6 May 1859 in Eccles – 14 June 1935 in Coniston) was an English chemist. He studied chemistry with Hans von Pechmann at the University of Munich. One of his students was Henry Drysdale Dakin.

Biography

Julius Berend Cohen and his twin brother Adolf were the only boys of ten children of Sigismund Cohen, a cotton merchant born in Hamburg, and Zena, née Berend, from South Shields, who were married in Manchester. Julius was born on 6 May 1859 in Eccles. Adolf fulfilled his father’s hope that he would join the family business. Julius tried it for a year but then switched to his first love: chemistry. From 1878-1880 he studied at Owens College, where Arthur Smithells was also working; the two were to become lifelong friends.

After an unhappy spell in industry at the Clayton Aniline Company Cohen joined Smithells in moving to Baeyer’s laboratory in Munich in 1882, where he worked with Hans von Pechmann. He remained for two years and gained his PhD. Back in Manchester he was appointed as a Demonstrator in chemistry at Owens College. In 1890 he joined Smithells at Yorkshire College, Leeds; he had been there since 1885.  When the college gained full university status in 1904, Cohen was appointed professor of organic chemistry. When he retired in 1924 he was made Emeritus Professor and the University awarded him the honorary degree of D.Sc.

Cohen was elected a Fellow of the Chemical Society in 1885, served on its Council from 1920- 1922 and from 1925-1928, in which time he was also a Vice-President. In 1911 he was elected a Fellow of the Royal Society. In 1930 Cohen received the honorary degree of LLD from the University of Glasgow.

Family

Julius Cohen married Hilda Hughes in 1892. Over the next nine years they had two sons and two daughters; all were born in Leeds, and all studied at its University. Their elder son, Adolph Broadfield, was killed in action in 1917, aged 24.

The close connections between the Cohens and the Smithells was reflected in marriages. 
Julius’s sister Amy married Edwin Smithells, brother of Arthur. They had a son, Colin James, who married Mary Cohen, the elder daughter of Julius and Hilda, in 1918.

In 1932 Julius and Hilda moved to Thwaite Cottage, Coniston. Julius died there on 14 June 1935. He was buried at St Andrew, Coniston. Hilda died on 21 November 1944, and was buried in the same grave.

Works

The Owens College Course of Practical Organic Chemistry, Macmillan & Co, 1887
Theoretical organic chemistry, Macmillan and Co Ltd, 1902
Practical organic chemistry for advanced students, Macmillan, 1907
Smoke. A study of town air, Edward Arnold, 1912
A Class-Book of Organic Chemistry, Macmillan & Co, 1917

References

External links 

 Entry in Biographical Database of the British Chemical Community, 1880-1970
 

1859 births
1935 deaths
Scientists from Manchester
English chemists
Fellows of the Royal Society